Pierre Macherey (born 17 February 1938, Belfort) is a French Marxist philosopher and literary critic at the University of Lille Nord de France.  A former student of Louis Althusser and collaborator on the influential volume Reading Capital, Macherey is a central figure in the development of French post-structuralism and Marxism.  His work is influential in literary theory and Continental philosophy in Europe (including Britain) though it is generally little read in the United States.

Scholarly work 
Macherey is known for his contribution to Reading Capital, his influential work in Marxist literary criticism, and intensive philosophical engagement with both Spinoza and Hegel. His work on these figures (from his early Hegel or Spinoza through his Hegel et la société and his five volume study of Spinoza's Ethics) complicates a relationship that is often otherwise taken to be a simple opposition between the competing paradigms of 'immanance' and 'dialectics'. For Macherey, as Jason Read puts it, "the task is not to choose between Team Hegel and Team Spinoza, but to interrogate each by means of the other."

Since October 2000, he has been engaged in a group project entitled "La Philosophie au sens large" (Philosophy in the grand sense), which has been hosted on the academic web platform Hypotheses.org since 2009. The project collects essays, presentations, and longer form studies that highlight the interrelation between philosophy and the literary, political, artistic, and social scientific thought that conditions it. The project is described as an attempt to reformulate the problematic of practice. In this context, Macherey has described philosophy in the 'grand sense' as " a conjunctural practice, which has no other means of surpassing the limits imposed by the conjunctures with which it is confronted other than to reflect on them and to elucidate their conditions in such a way as to eventually be able to intervene with regard to them and, therefore, to contribute to the transformation or evolution of these conjunctures."

Works

Only a partial selection of Macherey's work has been translated into English.

 "The Productive Subject", Viewpoint Magazine 5 (October 2015)
 Reading Capital, (1965 - with Louis Althusser, Étienne Balibar and Jacques Rancière)
 Hegel ou Spinoza, Maspéro, 1977 (reed. La Découverte, 2004)
 A Theory of Literary Production (1978): 
 Hegel et la société, PUF, (1984)
 The Object of Literature (1995): 
 In a Materialist Way: Selected Essays (1998 ed. Warren Montag): 
 "Hegel or Spinoza", University of Minnesota Press (Jan 2012). Translator, Susan M. Ruddick

References

External links
 Pierre Macherey's personal site
 Macherey from the Literary Encyclopedia
 Notes from generation-online.org

1938 births
Living people
French literary critics
Marxist theorists
École Normale Supérieure alumni
Academic staff of the University of Lille Nord de France
French male writers
French philosophers
Spinoza scholars
Spinozist philosophers
Neo-Spinozism